Nama Khoi Municipality is a local municipality in the Northern Cape Province of South Africa. It is administered from the town of Springbok.

Main places
The 2011 census divided the municipality into the following main places:

Politics

The municipal council consists of seventeen members elected by mixed-member proportional representation. Nine councillors are elected by first-past-the-post voting in nine wards, while the remaining eight are chosen from party lists so that the total number of party representatives is proportional to the number of votes received. In the election of 1 November 2021 no party obtained a majority on the council.

References

External links
 Nama Khoi Official website

Local municipalities of the Namakwa District Municipality